The Abwehrflammenwerfer 42 was a German static defensive flamethrower, flame fougasse or flame mine used during the Second World War. The design was copied from Russian FOG-1 mines that were encountered in 1941 during Operation Barbarossa. These were usually buried at intervals of  covering road blocks, landing beaches, harbour walls and other obstacles. They were normally mixed in with other mines or emplaced behind barbed wire and could be command detonated or triggered by tripwires or other devices.

When the mine was buried, only the flame tube was normally above ground.

When the mine was triggered, a squib charge ignited the propellant, creating a burst of hot gas which forced the fuel from the main cylinder and out of the flame tube. A second squib ignited the fuel as it passed out of the end of the tube.

References
 TM-E 30-451, Handbook on German Military Forces, War Department 
 Flamethrowers of the German Army 1914-1945 by Fred Koch

See also
Flame fougasse
List of flamethrowers

Flamethrowers
Land mines of Germany
World War II weapons of Germany